Sutivan is a town on the island of Brač, Split-Dalmatia County, Croatia. It has a population of 759 (2001 census), 93% which are Croats.

Sutivan was a fishing village and the harbour is still used by local fishermen. Today Sutivan has become a popular place for cyclists. Every year the town hosts a cycling race ‘Uvati Vitar’ (Catch the Wind) where entrants arrive from all over the world

External links 

 Official Website of Sutivan municipality (Croatian)

Municipalities of Croatia
Brač
Populated places in Split-Dalmatia County
Populated coastal places in Croatia